David Aparecido da Silva (born 12 November 1989), commonly known as David da Silva, is a Brazilian professional footballer who plays as a striker for Liga 1 club Persib Bandung.

Career

Shelbourne
On 11 August 2011, Da Silva signed a contract with League of Ireland club Shelbourne. He made his League of Ireland debut on 13 August 2011 as he came on as a substitute at the 86th minute for Philip Hughes in a 3–1 win over Longford Town. He played his first home game for Drumcondra-based club at the Tolka Park on 3 October 2011 in a 4–3 win over Limerick in the quarter-finals of the 2011 FAI Cup. He came on as a substitute at the 89th minute for Hughes in a 1–1 draw against St Patrick's Athletic in the semi-finals.

Persebaya Surabaya
In 2018, Da Silva was signed for Persebaya Surabaya to play in Indonesia President's Cup and Liga 1 in the 2018 season, Da Silva made his Persebaya debut in a pre-season 2018 Indonesia President's Cup against Madura United on 28 January 2018 On 30 March 2018, Da Silva made his league debut as a substitute by Rishadi Fauzi in a 1–1 draw against Persela Lamongan. And he also scored his first goal for the team, he scored in the 70th minute at Surajaya Stadium. On 13 April, Da Silva scored his first Persebaya hat-trick in a 1–4 away win against TIRA-Persikabo at Sultan Agung Stadium. On 5 August, Da Silva scored a brace in Persebaya's 3–1 home win against Persela Lamongan. On 22 September, Da Silva scored a hat-trick in a 4–1 victory at PS Mitra Kukar, become a player with second hat-trick for the club at the season, he also scored his third hat-trick for the club in a 2–5 away win against Bali United on 18 November.

While he had a good season in his first year in Indonesia with 23 league appearances and scored 20 goals from a total of 60 goals with Persebaya in 2018 Liga 1, Da Silva decided to South Korea at the end of the contract year.

Pohang Steelers
On 9 January 2019, Da Silva signed a one-year contract with K League 1 club Pohang Steelers. He made his league debut for Pohang Steelers when he was part of the starting lineup of a 2019 K League 1 match against FC Seoul on 3 March 2019 at Seoul World Cup Stadium. On 10 March, Da Silva scored his first league goal for Pohang Steelers in a 1–2 away lose over Gimcheon Sangmu at Pohang Steel Yard.

Honours
Persebaya Surabaya
 East Java Governor Cup: 2020

Individual
Liga 1 Best Eleven: 2018
Liga 1 Best Goal: 2019
Liga 1 Player of the Month: December 2022, January 2023

References

External links
 
 
 
 David da Silva - Birkirkara FC
 
 David da Silva - EUROSPORT

1989 births
Living people
Brazilian footballers
Association football forwards
Birkirkara F.C. players
Shelbourne F.C. players
Grêmio Catanduvense de Futebol players
TP Mazembe players
Khor Fakkan Sports Club players
Al-Musannah SC players
Al-Orobah FC players
Zweigen Kanazawa players
Qadsia SC players
Al-Khor SC players
Persebaya Surabaya players
Pohang Steelers players
Terengganu FC players
Persib Bandung players
Maltese Premier League players
League of Ireland players
Linafoot players
UAE First Division League players
Oman Professional League players
Saudi First Division League players
J2 League players
Kuwait Premier League players
Qatar Stars League players
Liga 1 (Indonesia) players
K League 1 players
Malaysia Super League players
Brazilian expatriate footballers
Brazilian expatriate sportspeople in Malta
Brazilian expatriate sportspeople in Ireland
Brazilian expatriate sportspeople in the Democratic Republic of the Congo
Brazilian expatriate sportspeople in the United Arab Emirates
Brazilian expatriate sportspeople in Oman
Brazilian expatriate sportspeople in Saudi Arabia
Brazilian expatriate sportspeople in Japan
Brazilian expatriate sportspeople in Kuwait
Brazilian expatriate sportspeople in Qatar
Brazilian expatriate sportspeople in Indonesia
Brazilian expatriate sportspeople in South Korea
Expatriate footballers in Malta
Expatriate association footballers in the Republic of Ireland
Expatriate footballers in the Democratic Republic of the Congo
Expatriate footballers in the United Arab Emirates
Expatriate footballers in Oman
Expatriate footballers in Saudi Arabia
Expatriate footballers in Japan
Expatriate footballers in Kuwait
Expatriate footballers in Qatar
Expatriate footballers in Indonesia
Expatriate footballers in South Korea
Footballers from São Paulo (state)